Xavier Richards (born 25 April 1993) is a former professional Australian rules footballer who played for the Sydney Swans in the Australian Football League (AFL).

Richards played for the East Sandringham Junior Club, he went on to play for the Sandringham Dragons in the TAC Cup and Vic Metro at the AFL Under 18 Championships. His older brother Ted Richards also played for the Sydney Swans.

He made his senior debut against Carlton in round 14 of the 2013 AFL season as a late replacement for Mitch Morton, who withdrew from the side due to injury.

At the conclusion of 2016 season, he requested a trade from the Swans after failing to agree to terms for a new contract. However, he was unable to find a club during the trade period and was subsequently delisted by the club less than four weeks after appearing in the 2016 AFL Grand Final. He nominated for the AFL draft, but was not selected by any club.

Statistics

|- style="background-color: #EAEAEA"
! scope="row" style="text-align:center" | 2013
|
| 42 || 1 || 0 || 0 || 1 || 0 || 1 || 0 || 0 || 0.0 || 0.0 || 1.0 || 0.0 || 1.0 || 0.0 || 0.0
|-
! scope="row" style="text-align:center" | 2014
|
| 42 || 0 || — || — || — || — || — || — || — || — || — || — || — || — || — || —
|- style="background-color: #EAEAEA"
! scope="row" style="text-align:center" | 2015
|
| 42 || 1 || 0 || 0 || 6 || 4 || 10 || 4 || 4 || 0.0 || 0.0 || 6.0 || 4.0 || 10.0 || 4.0 || 4.0
|-
! scope="row" style="text-align:center" | 2016
|
| 42 || 10 || 13 || 7 || 79 || 51 || 130 || 55 || 18 || 1.3 || 0.7 || 7.9 || 5.1 || 13.0 || 5.5 || 1.8
|- class="sortbottom"
! colspan=3| Career
! 12
! 13
! 7
! 86
! 55
! 141
! 59
! 22
! 1.1
! 0.6
! 7.2
! 4.6
! 11.8
! 4.9
! 1.8
|}

References

External links

 
 

Living people
1993 births
Sydney Swans players
Sandringham Dragons players
Australian rules footballers from Victoria (Australia)
Sandringham Football Club players
Sydney University Australian National Football Club players